One Day International (ODI) cricket is played between international cricket teams who are Full Members of the International Cricket Council (ICC) as well as the top four Associate members. Unlike Test matches, ODIs consist of one inning per team, having a limit in the number of overs, currently 50 overs per innings – although in the past this has been 55 or 60 overs. ODI cricket is List-A cricket, so statistics and records set in ODI matches also count toward List-A records. The earliest match recognised as an ODI was played between England and Australia in January 1971; since when there have been over 4,000 ODIs played by 28 teams. 
This is a list of Pakistan Cricket team's One Day International records. It is based on the List of One Day International cricket records, but concentrates solely on records dealing with the Pakistani cricket team. Pakistan played its first ever ODI in 1973.

Key
The top five records are listed for each category, except for the team wins, losses, draws and ties, all round records and the partnership records. Tied records for fifth place are also included. Explanations of the general symbols and cricketing terms used in the list are given below. Specific details are provided in each category where appropriate. All records include matches played for Pakistan only, and are correct .

Team records

Overall Record

Team wins, losses, draws and ties 
, Pakistan has played 945 ODI matches resulting in 496 victories, 420 defeats, 9 ties and 20 no results for an overall winning percentage of 52.48

First bilateral ODI series wins

First ODI match wins

Winning every match in a series 
In a bilateral series winning all matches is referred to as whitewash. First such event occurred when West Indies toured England in 1976. Pakistan have recorded 20 such series victories.

Losing every match in a series 
Pakistan have also suffered such whitewash 11 times.

Team scoring records

Most runs in an innings
The highest innings total scored in ODIs came in the match between England and Australia in June 2018. Playing in the third ODI at Trent Bridge in Nottingham, the hosts posted a total of 481/6. The fourth ODI against Zimbabwe in July 2018 saw Pakistan set their highest innings total of 399/1.

Fewest runs in an innings
The lowest innings total scored in ODIs has been scored twice. Zimbabwe were dismissed for 35 by Sri Lanka during the third ODI in Sri Lanka's tour of Zimbabwe in April 2004 and USA were dismissed for same score by Nepal in the sixth ODI of the 2020 ICC Cricket World League 2 in Nepal in February 2020. The lowest score in ODI history for Pakistan is 43 scored against West Indies in the 1992-93 Total International Series.

Most runs conceded an innings
The third ODI of the 2016 ODI Series against the England saw Pakistan concede their highest innings total of 444/3.

Fewest runs conceded in an innings
The lowest score conceded by Pakistan for a full inning is 64 scored by New Zealand in the 1986 Austral-Asia Cup at Sharjah.

Most runs aggregate in a match
The highest match aggregate scored in ODIs came in the match between South Africa and Australia in the fifth ODI of March 2006 series at Wanderers Stadium, Johannesburg when South Africa scored 438/9 in response to Australia's 434/4. The second ODI against England in Rose Bowl, Southampton saw a total of 734 runs being scored.

Fewest runs aggregate in a match
The lowest match aggregate in ODIs is 71 when USA were dismissed for 35 by Nepal in the sixth ODI of the 2020 ICC Cricket World League 2 in Nepal in February 2020. The lowest match aggregate in ODI history for Pakistan is 88 scored ninth match of the 1992-93 Total International Series against West Indies, which is fifth lowest of all time.

Result records
An ODI match is won when one side has scored more runs than the total runs scored by the opposing side during their innings. If both sides have completed both their allocated innings and the side that fielded last has the higher aggregate of runs, it is known as a win by runs. This indicates the number of runs that they had scored more than the opposing side. If the side batting last wins the match, it is known as a win by wickets, indicating the number of wickets that were still to fall.

Greatest win margins (by runs)
The greatest winning margin by runs in ODIs was New Zealand's victory over Ireland by 290 runs in the only ODI of the 2008 England tour. The largest victory recorded by Pakistan was during the Pakistan's tour of Ireland in 2016 by 255 runs.

Greatest win margins (by balls remaining)
The greatest winning margin by balls remaining in ODIs was England's victory over Canada by 8 wickets with 277 balls remaining in the 1979 Cricket World Cup. The largest victory recorded by Pakistan is during the Pakistan's tour of Zimbabwe in 2018 when they won by 9 wickets with 241 balls remaining.

Greatest win margins (by wickets)
A total of 55 matches have ended with chasing team winning by 10 wickets with West Indies winning by such margins a record 10 times. Pakistan have won an ODI match by this margin on four occasions.

Highest successful run chases
South Africa holds the record for the highest successful run chase which they achieved when they scored 438/9 in response to Australia's 434/9. Pakistan's highest innings total while chasing is 349 in a successful run chase against Australia at Lahore, Pakistan during the Australia tour of Pakistan in 2022.

Narrowest win margins (by runs)
The narrowest run margin victory is by 1 run which has been achieved in 31 ODI's with Australia winning such games a record 6 times. Pakistan's has achieved any victory by 1 run on two occasions.

Narrowest win margins (by balls remaining)
The narrowest winning margin by balls remaining in ODIs is by winning of the last ball which has been achieved 36 times with both South Africa winning seven times. Pakistan has achieved a victory by this margin on five occasions.

Narrowest win margins (by wickets)
The narrowest margin of victory by wickets is 1 wicket which has settled 55 such ODIs. Both West Indies and New Zealand have recorded such victory on eight occasions. Pakistan has won the match by a margin of one wicket on seven occasions.

Greatest loss margins (by runs)
Pakistan's biggest defeat by runs was against Sri Lanka in the Sri Lanka's ill-fated tour of Pakistan in early 2009 at Gaddafi Stadium, Lahore, Pakistan.

Greatest loss margins (by balls remaining)
The greatest winning margin by balls remaining in ODIs was England's victory over Canada by 8 wickets with 277 balls remaining in the 1979 Cricket World Cup. The largest defeat suffered by Pakistan was against West Indies in South Africa during the 1992-93 Total International Series when they lost by 7 wickets with 225 balls remaining.

Greatest loss margins (by wickets)
Pakistan have lost an ODI match by a margin of 10 wickets on three occasions with most recent being during the fifth match of the Pakistan's tour of West Indies in 2011.

Narrowest loss margins (by runs)
The narrowest loss of Pakistan in terms of runs is by 1 runs suffered four times.

Narrowest loss margins (by balls remaining)
The narrowest winning margin by balls remaining in ODIs is by winning of the last ball which has been achieved 36 times with both South Africa winning seven times. Pakistan has suffered loss by this margin three times.

Narrowest loss margins (by wickets)
Pakistan has suffered defeat by 1 wicket on six occasions.

Tied matches 
A tie can occur when the scores of both teams are equal at the conclusion of play, provided that the side batting last has completed their innings. 
There have been 37 ties in ODIs history with Pakistan involved in 8 such games.

Individual records

Batting records

Most career runs
A run is the basic means of scoring in cricket.
India's Sachin Tendulkar has scored the most runs in ODIs with 18,246. Second is Kumar Sangakkara of Sri Lanka with 14,234 ahead of Ricky Ponting from Australia in third with 13,704. Inzamam-ul-Haq is the leading Pakistani on this list.

Fastest runs getter

Most runs against each opponent

Most runs in each batting position

Highest individual score

The fourth ODI of the Sri Lanka's tour of India in 2014 saw Rohit Sharma score the highest Individual score. Fakhar Zaman holds the Pakistani record when he scored 210* against Zimbabwe in the fourth ODI of the 2018 series.

Highest individual score – progression of record

Highest score against each opponent

Highest career average
A batsman's batting average is the total number of runs they have scored divided by the number of times they have been dismissed.

Highest Average in each batting position

Most half-centuries
A half-century is a score of between 50 and 99 runs. Statistically, once a batsman's score reaches 100, it is no longer considered a half-century but a century.

Sachin Tendulkar of India has scored the most half-centuries in ODIs with 96. He is followed by the Sri Lanka's Kumar Sangakkara on 93, South Africa's Jacques Kallis on 86 and India's Rahul Dravid and Pakistan's Inzamam-ul-Haq on 83.

Most centuries
A century is a score of 100 or more runs in a single innings.17

Tendulkar has also scored the most centuries in ODIs with 49. Saeed Anwar has the most centuries for Pakistan.

Most Sixes

Most Fours

Highest strike rates
Andre Russell of West Indies holds the record for highest strike rate, with minimum 500 balls faced qualification, with 130.22. Shahid Afridi is the Pakistani with the highest strike rate.

Highest strike rates in an inning
James Franklin of New Zealand's strike rate of 387.50 during his 31* off 8 balls against Canada during 2011 Cricket World Cup is the world record for highest strike rate in an innings. Shahid Afridi holds the top three positions for a Pakistan player in this list.

Most runs in a calendar year
Tendulkar holds the record for most runs scored in a calendar year with 1894 runs scored in 1998. Saeed Anwar scored 1595 runs in 1996, the most for a Pakistan batsmen in a year.

Most runs in a series
The 1980–81 Benson & Hedges World Series Cup in Australia saw Greg Chappell set the record for the most runs scored in a single series scoring 685 runs. He is followed by Sachin Tendulkar with 673 runs scored in the 2003 Cricket World Cup.Fakhar Zaman has scored the most runs in a series for a Pakistan batsmen, when he scored 515 runs in the Pakistan's tour of Zimbabwe in 2018.

Most ducks
A duck refers to a batsman being dismissed without scoring a run. 
Sanath Jayasuriya has scored the equal highest number of ducks in ODIs with 34 such knocks. Pakistan's Shahid Afridi with 30 ducks is second on the all-time list (he has 29 ducks for Pakistan and 1 for Asia XI).

Bowling records

Most career wickets
A bowler takes the wicket of a batsman when the form of dismissal is bowled, caught, leg before wicket, stumped or hit wicket. If the batsman is dismissed by run out, obstructing the field, handling the ball, hitting the ball twice or timed out the bowler does not receive credit.

Wasim Akram, former captain of Pakistan national cricket team and widely acknowledged as one of the greatest bowlers of all time and "Sultan of Swing", is the second highest wicket-taker in ODIs behind Sri Lankan wizard Muttiah Muralitharan.

Fastest wicket taker

Most wickets against each opponent

Best figures in an innings
Bowling figures refers to the number of the wickets a bowler has taken and the number of runs conceded.
Sri Lanka's Chaminda Vaas holds the world record for best figures in an innings when he took 8/19 against Zimbabwe in December 2001 at Colombo (SSC). Shahid Afridi holds the Pakistani record for best bowling figures.

Best figures in an innings – progression of record

Best Bowling Figure against each opponent

Best career average
A bowler's bowling average is the total number of runs they have conceded divided by the number of wickets they have taken.
Afghanistan's Rashid Khan holds the record for the best career average in ODIs with 18.54. Joel Garner, West Indian cricketer, and a member of the highly regarded late 1970s and early 1980s West Indies cricket teams, is second behind Rashid with an overall career average of 18.84 runs per wicket. Saqlain Mushtaq is the highest ranked Pakistani when the qualification of 2000 balls bowled is followed.

Best career economy rate
A bowler's economy rate is the total number of runs they have conceded divided by the number of overs they have bowled.
West Indies' Joel Garner, holds the ODI record for the best career economy rate with 3.09. Pakistan's sarfraz Nawaz, with a rate of 3.63 runs per over conceded over his 45-match ODI career, is the highest Pakistani on the list.

Best career strike rate
A bowler's strike rate is the total number of balls they have bowled divided by the number of wickets they have taken.
The top bowler with the best ODI career strike rate is South Africa's Lungi Ngidi with strike rate of 23.2 balls per wicket. Saqlain Mushtaq is the highest ranked Pakistani in this list.

Most four-wickets (& over) hauls in an innings
Waqar Younis has taken the most four-wickets (or over) among all the bowlers.

Most five-wicket hauls in a match
A five-wicket haul refers to a bowler taking five wickets in a single innings.
Waqar Younis with 13 such hauls has the most hauls among all the bowlers.

Best economy rates in an inning
The best economy rate in an inning, when a minimum of 30 balls are delivered by the player, is West Indies player Phil Simmons economy of 0.30 during his spell of 3 runs for 4 wickets in 10 overs against Pakistan at Sydney Cricket Ground in the 1991-92 Australian Tri-Series. Wasim Akram holds the Pakistani record during his spell in 1986-87 Champions Trophy against India at Sharjah, UAE.

Best strike rates in an inning
The best strike rate in an inning, when a minimum of 4 wickets are taken by the player, is shared by Sunil Dhaniram of Canada, Paul Collingwood of England and Virender Sehwag of India when they achieved a strike rate of 4.2 balls pr wicket. Mudassar Nazar during his spell of 4/27 achieved the best strike rate for a Pakistani bowler.

Worst figures in an innings
The worst figures in an ODI came in the 5th One Day International between South Africa at home to Australia in 2006. Australia's Mick Lewis returned figures of 0/113 from his 10 overs in the second innings of the match. The worst figures by a Pakistani is 0/110 that came off the bowling of Wahab Riaz in the third ODI against England at Nottingham.

Most runs conceded in a match
Mick Lewis also holds the dubious distinction of most runs conceded in an ODI during the aforementioned match. Riaz holds the most runs conceded distinction for Pakistan.

Most wickets in a calendar year
Pakistan's Saqlain Mushtaq holds the record for most wickets taken in a year when he took 69 wickets in 1997 in 36 ODIs.

Most wickets in a series
1998–99 Carlton and United Series involving Australia, England and Sri Lanka and the 2019 Cricket World Cup saw the records set for the most wickets taken by a bowler in an ODI series when Australian pacemen Glenn McGrath and Mitchell Starc achieved a total of 27 wickets during the series, respectively. Waqar Younis in the 1994-95 Mandela Trophy and Shahid Afridi at 2011 Cricket World Cup are joint 16th with 21 wickets taken a series.

Hat-trick
In cricket, a hat-trick occurs when a bowler takes three wickets with consecutive deliveries. The deliveries may be interrupted by an over bowled by another bowler from the other end of the pitch or the other team's innings, but must be three consecutive deliveries by the individual bowler in the same match. Only wickets attributed to the bowler count towards a hat-trick; run outs do not count.
In ODIs history there have been just 49 hat-tricks, the first achieved by Jalal-ud-Din for Pakistan against Australia in 1982.

Wicket-keeping records
The wicket-keeper is a specialist fielder who stands behind the stumps being guarded by the batsman on strike and is the only member of the fielding side allowed to wear gloves and leg pads.

Most career dismissals
A wicket-keeper can be credited with the dismissal of a batsman in two ways, caught or stumped. A fair catch is taken when the ball is caught fully within the field of play without it bouncing after the ball has touched the striker's bat or glove holding the bat, Laws 5.6.2.2 and 5.6.2.3 state that the hand or the glove holding the bat shall be regarded as the ball striking or touching the bat while a stumping occurs when the wicket-keeper puts down the wicket while the batsman is out of his ground and not attempting a run.
Pakistan's Moin Khan is fifth in taking most dismissals in ODIs as a designated wicket-keeper with Sri Lanka's Kumar Sangakkara and Australian Adam Gilchrist heading the list.

Most career catches
Moin Khan is sixth in taking most catches in ODIs as a designated wicket-keeper.

Most career stumpings
Moin Khan is fourth in making stumpings in ODIs as a designated wicket-keeper.

Most dismissals in an innings
Ten wicket-keepers on 15 occasions have taken six dismissals in a single innings in an ODI. Adam Gilchrist of Australia alone has done it six times. Sarfaraz Ahmed is the only Pakistani wicket keeper to have achieved this.

The feat of taking 5 dismissals in an innings has been achieved by 49 wicket-keepers on 87 occasions including 2 Pakistanis.

Most dismissals in a series
Gilchrist also holds the ODIs record for the most dismissals taken by a wicket-keeper in a series. He made 27 dismissals during the 1998–99 Carlton & United Series. Pakistani record is held by Moin Khan when he made 19 dismissals during the 1999-00 Carlton & United Series.

Fielding records

Most career catches
Caught is one of the nine methods a batsman can be dismissed in cricket. The majority of catches are caught in the slips, located behind the batsman, next to the wicket-keeper, on the off side of the field. Most slip fielders are top order batsmen.

Sri Lanka's Mahela Jayawardene holds the record for the most catches in ODIs by a non-wicket-keeper with 218, followed by Ricky Ponting of Australia on 160 and Indian Mohammad Azharuddin with 156.Younus Khan is the leading catcher for Pakistan.

Most catches in an innings
South Africa's Jonty Rhodes is the only fielder to have taken five catches in an innings.

The feat of taking 4 catches in an innings has been achieved by 42 fielders on 44 occasions including four Pakistani fielders on five occasions.

Most catches in a series
The 2019 Cricket World Cup, which was won by England for the first time, saw the record set for the most catches taken by a non-wicket-keeper in an ODI series. Englishman batsman and captain of the England Test team Joe Root took 13 catches in the series as well as scored 556 runs. Wasim Raja, Saleem Malik and Younus Khan with 7 catches in the same series are the leading Pakistani's on this list.

All-round Records

1000 runs and 100 wickets
A total of 64 players have achieved the double of 1000 runs and 100 wickets in their ODI career.

250 runs and 5 wickets in a series
A total of 50 players on 103 occasions have achieved the double of 250 runs and 5 wickets in a series.

Other records

Most career matches
India's Sachin Tendulkar holds the record for the most ODI matches played with 463, with former captains Mahela Jayawardene and Sanath Jayasuriya being second and third having represented Sri Lanka on 443 and 441 occasions, respectively. Shahid Afridi is the most experienced Pakistan players having represented the team on 393 occasions.

Most consecutive career matches
Tendulkar also holds the record for the most consecutive ODI matches played with 185. He broke Richie Richardson's long standing record of 132 matches.

Most matches as captain

Ricky Ponting, who led the Australian cricket team from 2002 to 2012, holds the record for the most matches played as captain in ODIs with 230 (including 1 as captain of ICC World XI team). 1992 Cricket World Cup winning Pakistan skipper Imran Khan has led Pakistan in 139 matches, the most for any player from his country.

Youngest players on Debut
The youngest player to play in an ODI match is claimed to be Hasan Raza at the age of 14 years and 233 days. Making his debut for Pakistan against Zimbabwe on 30 October 1996, there is some doubt as to the validity of Raza's age at the time.

Oldest players on Debut
The Netherlands batsmen Nolan Clarke is the oldest player to appear in an ODI match. Playing in the 1996 Cricket World Cup against New Zealand in 1996 at Reliance Stadium in Vadodara, India he was aged 47 years and 240 days. Younis Ahmed is the oldest Pakistani ODI debutant when he played the second ODI during the 1987 tour of India at the Eden Gardens, Kolkata.

Oldest players
The Netherlands batsmen Nolan Clarke is the oldest player to appear in an ODI match. Playing in the 1996 Cricket World Cup against South Africa in 1996 at Rawalpindi Cricket Stadium in Rawalpindi, Pakistan he was aged 47 years and 257 days.

Partnership records
In cricket, two batsmen are always present at the crease batting together in a partnership. This partnership will continue until one of them is dismissed, retires or the innings comes to a close.

Highest partnerships by wicket
A wicket partnership describes the number of runs scored before each wicket falls. The first wicket partnership is between the opening batsmen and continues until the first wicket falls. The second wicket partnership then commences between the not out batsman and the number three batsman. This partnership continues until the second wicket falls. The third wicket partnership then commences between the not out batsman and the new batsman. This continues down to the tenth wicket partnership. When the tenth wicket has fallen, there is no batsman left to partner so the innings is closed.

Highest partnerships by runs
The highest ODI partnership by runs for any wicket is held by the West Indian pairing of Chris Gayle and Marlon Samuels who put together a second wicket partnership of 372 runs during the 2015 Cricket World Cup against Zimbabwe in February 2015. This broke the record of 331 runs set by Indian pair of Sachin Tendulkar and Rahul Dravid against New Zealand in 1999

Highest overall partnership runs by a pair

Umpiring records

Most matches umpired
An umpire in cricket is a person who officiates the match according to the Laws of Cricket. Two umpires adjudicate the match on the field, whilst a third umpire has access to video replays, and a fourth umpire looks after the match balls and other duties. The records below are only for on-field umpires.

Rudi Koertzen of South Africa holds the record for the most ODI matches umpired with 209. The current active Aleem Dar is currently at 208 matches. They are followed by New Zealand's Billy Bowden who officiated in 200 matches.

See also

List of One Day International cricket records
List of players who have scored 10,000 or more runs in One Day International cricket
List of One Day International cricket hat-tricks
List of Test cricket records
List of List A cricket records
List of Cricket World Cup records

Notes

References

One Day International